The second USS Thetis (SP-391) was a United States Navy patrol vessel in commission from 1917 to 1919.
 
Thetis was built as a private steam yacht of the same name in 1901 by George Lawley & Son at Neponset, Massachusetts. On 23 June 1917, the U.S. Navy purchased her from Charles H. Fuller of Pawtucket, Rhode Island, for use as a patrol vessel during World War I. She was commissioned as USS Thetis (SP-391) on 9 July 1917.

Assigned to the 2nd Naval District, Thetis served on the section patrol in southern New England. She patrolled the coast of the United States between Chatham, Massachusetts, and New London, Connecticut, for the remainder of World War I.

Thetis was decommissioned after the end of the war and stricken from the Navy List on 31 March 1919. She was sold to Mr. Herman Lee Meader of New York City on 19 July 1920.

References

Department of the Navy Naval History and Heritage Command Online Library of Selected Images: U.S. Navy Ships: USS Thetis (SP-391), 1917-1920
NavSource Online: Section Patrol Craft Photo Archive: Thetis (SP 391)

External links

Patrol vessels of the United States Navy
World War I patrol vessels of the United States
Ships built in Boston
1901 ships
Individual yachts